Aiyappa is a surname. Notable people with the surname include:

Apparanda Aiyappa (1913–?), British Indian Army officer
Len Aiyappa (born 1979), Indian field hockey player
Neravanda Aiyappa (born 1979), Indian cricketer
Pramila Aiyappa (born 1977), Indian heptathlete
Shubra Aiyappa (born 1987), Indian actress